The Diocese of Llandaff is an Anglican (Church in Wales) diocese that traces its roots to pre-Reformation times as heir of a Catholic bishopric. It is headed by the Bishop of Llandaff, whose seat is located at the Cathedral Church of Saint Peter and Saint Paul in Llandaff, a suburb of Cardiff. It currently covers most of the former Welsh county of Glamorgan, but once stretched from the River Towy to the middle of the Wye Valley.

Archdeaconries and deaneries 
The diocese of Llandaff is currently divided into two archdeaconries: Llandaff and Margam. From 2002–2020 there was a third archdeaconry, that of Morgannwg; in 2020, of its four deaneries, Pontypridd and Merthyr Tydfil & Caerphilly moved to Llandaff, and Cynon Valley and Rhondda moved to Margam.

Archdeacons of Llandaff
See Archdeacon of Llandaff

Archdeacons of Margam
See Archdeacon of Margam

Archdeacons of Morgannwg
2002–2004 (ret.): Martin Williams
2004–2006 (res.): David Yeoman
2006–2020: Chris Smith

Pre-reformation history : Catholic bishopric

Legendary foundations

Lucius of Britain 
A number of traditions associate Llandaff with Lucius of Britain. Lucius was believed to be a 2nd century king who first beseeched the Pope (Eleutherius) to convert him to Christianity. The Pope's response was to send a Christian mission to Britain, which would include the building of Britain's first church. The Welsh Triads relate this tradition to Llandaff, stating that Lucius "made the first Church at Llandaf, which was the first in the Isle of Britain." another triad lists ""the three archbishoprics of the Isle of Britain" and states that "the first was Llandaf, of the gift of Lleirwg (Lucius), the son of Coel, the son of Cyllin, who first gave lands and civil privileges to such as first embraced the faith in Christ." Although the Lucius legend is now considered to be pseudohistory, it was recounted by Nennius, Bede and Geoffrey of Monmouth, and seems to have been widely accepted in the medieval period.

Four names are associated with the task of executing the Pope's wishes, these include the early Welsh saints Fagan, Deruvian and Elvan. Fagan is sometimes named as "the first Bishop of Llandaff" while all three became patrons of churches and villages throughout the diocese. Iolo Morgannwg also linked these early figures to Llandaff, writing extensively on this supposed early foundation. In the Iolo Manuscripts, he credits Fagan as the second Bishop of Llandaff (succeeding Dyfan, a figure Iolo conflates with Deruvian).

Saint Dubricius 
The diocese was reputedly founded in 560 or earlier by Saint Teilo, during the monastic movement initiated by Saint Dubricius who presided over several monasteries in Ergyng, including Hentland and Moccas. Dubricius is said to have made Teilo abbot of this daughter monastery at Llandaff, which after Dubricius' death became a monastic cathedral and the chief monastery in South Wales. Saint Dubricius is usually given as the first bishop.

The early history of diocese is, however, highly controversial, because the chief authority, the diocesan charters in the Book of Llandaff, though dating from the late 6th century, were considerably doctored to raise Llandaff's profile when they were copied in the early 12th century. Similarly, the saints' 'lives' therein have little basis in fact. Gilbert Hunter Doble and others have clearly demonstrated that there is no evidence that Saints Dubricius and Teilo had anything to do with Llandaff. Dubricius was only active in Ergyng and Gwent, while Teilo's associations with Llandaff have been transferred from his great abbey at Llandeilo Fawr.

Early times 
The original church at Llandaff (perhaps a monastery) may well have been an early foundation. However, it is likely to have been founded by Saint Oudoceus rather than Saint Teilo. The early episcopal authority in the area was, indeed, in Ergyng and Gwent, originally under Dubricius and then his disciples. Their base may have been at Welsh Bicknor, Kenderchurch or Glasbury. Teilo's foundation at Llandeilo may have superseded Ergyng in the mid-7th century or, as David Nash Ford suggests, the two may have remained the seats of independent, yet parallel, bishoprics, as late as the mid-9th century. Both had accepted the ways of the Roman Catholic Church in 777.

There certainly seems to have only been a single diocese by the late 9th century, based at Llandeilo. The Bishops were known as 'Bishop of Teilo'. When exactly the bishop's cathedra (and the Teilo traditions) moved to Llandaff, however, is not clear. Ford, again, suggests a date not much later, after the death of Bishop Nobis in 874. However, a date in the early 11th century or even later cannot be ruled out. The bishops of Llandaff long maintained absolute independence within their own territories, and the rights and privileges of the Church of Llandaff were extensive. However, there is a tradition that by 872, the bishops had already, nominally at least, accepted the authority of the English Province of Canterbury. Certainly this was the case by 982. The first Saxon bishop, Wulfrith, had been installed in 930, though he may have been of dual-nationality.

Norman times onwards 
After the Norman Conquest of south-east Wales in the 1090s, the archbishops of Canterbury began to exercise their jurisdiction over Wales, and Saint Anselm placed Bishop Herewald of Llandaff under interdict. Herewald's successor, Urban, was consecrated at Canterbury, after taking an oath of canonical obedience to the archbishop, and from that time Llandaff became a full dependent of Canterbury. Standing difficulties were the admixture of race and language due to the English settlements and the ignorance and incontinence of the Welsh clergy, who had ceased to observe celibacy and gave scandal to the Normans and English alike. A reform was gradually effected, chiefly by the establishment of new monasteries and mendicant houses. The Book of Llandaff, now at the National Library of Wales, Aberystwyth, reflects Urban's territorial ambitions for his diocese. The present cathedral dates substantially from his time, 1120 and later.

Catholic Ordinaries 
Suffragan Bishops of Landaff
 incomplete – first centuries lacking
 John de Egglescliffe, Dominican Order (O.P.) (1323.06.20 – death 1347.01.02), previously Bishop of Connor (Ireland) (1322 – 1323.06.20)
 John Paschal, Carmelite Order (O. Carm.) (1347.02.19 – death 1361.10.11)
 Roger Cradock, Friars Minor (O.F.M.) (1361.12.15 – death 1382.06.22), previously Bishop of Waterford (Ireland) (1350.03.02 – 1361.12.15)
 Thomas Rushook (Thomas Rushooke), O.P. (1383.05.03 – 1385.11.07), next Bishop of Chichester (England) (1385.11.07 – 1388), Bishop of Brefinnia (Ireland) (1388 – ?retired 1390?), died 1393
 William Bottlesham (1385.12.02 – 1389.08.27), previously Bishop of Bethléem à Clamecy ('Bethelehem' exiled in Burgundy, France) (1383 – 1385.12.02); later Bishop of Rochester (England) (1389.08.27 – death 1400.02)
 Robert Tideman of Winchcombe (1393 – 1395.06.15), next Bishop of Worcester (England) (1395.06.15 – death 1401.06.13)
 John Burghill (1396.04.12 – 1398.07.02), next Bishop of Coventry and Lichfield (England) (1398.07.02 – death 1414.05.20)
 ...
TO COMPLETE

Anglican Reformation 
In the religious turmoil of the 16th century, the Bishop of Llandaff, Anthony Kitchin, was the only bishop in office at the accession of Elizabeth I who acquiesced in the religious changes and was accounted an apostate by fellow Catholics. He died in 1563. Rome had already decided to suppress the Catholic see in 1530;

Thereafter, there continued a line of Anglican bishops up to the present day. Some of these showed aptitude for the conditions of the post, e. g. Blethyn and Morgan (the translator of the Bible), also those appointed under Charles II. Another Morgan suffered many years imprisonment for his Laudian convictions. The administration of the diocese suffered from its poor endowment and limited patronage, leading at the end of the 18th century to non-resident bishops (e.g. Watson) and the holding with other ecclesiastical benefices (such as the Deanery of St. Paul's). Failure to speak Welsh characterised the bishops during this period. Bishop Ollivant notably took up the challenge of providing churches for the newly industrialised valleys. The population explosion created pressure for the division of the diocese, which was put into effect with Disestablishment. The diocese remained part of the Province of Canterbury until the creation of the Church in Wales on 31 March 1920.

In the 20th century Anglo-Catholic parishes were numerous and gave a distinctive High Church character to the diocese. Opposition to the ordination of female priests was widespread and their introduction delayed for some time.

Catholic successors 
When the Metropolitan Archdiocese of Cardiff was founded on 7 February 1916, it was considered the restoration of the Catholic see of Llandaf, enjoying its apostolic succession, although its territory was reassigned from the simultaneously suppressed Diocese of Newport.

It was however on territory of the concurrently suppressed Catholic Roman Catholic Diocese of Newport (originally Newport and Menevia), which had been established in 1840 as Apostolic Vicariate of the Welsh District, on territory split from the Anglo-Welsh Apostolic Vicariate of the Western District. It was no assigned a co-cathedral not saw its title revived, its Former Cathedral of Sts. Peter and Paul, St. Dyfrig, St. Telio and St. Euddogwy, in Llandaff remaining a Protestant church.

List of churches

Deanery of Cardiff

Closed churches in the area

Deanery of Llandaff

Closed churches in the area

Notes

Deanery of Merthyr Tydfil and Caerphilly

Notes

Closed churches in the area

Deanery of Penarth and Barry

Closed churches in the area

Deanery of Pontypridd

Closed churches in the area

Notes

Deanery of Bridgend

Closed churches in the area

Deanery of Cynon Valley

Closed churches in the area

Deanery of Margam

Closed churches in the area

Deanery of Neath

Closed churches in the area

Deanery of Rhondda

Closed churches in the area

Deanery of Vale of Glamorgan

Closed churches in the area

See also 
 List of Catholic dioceses in England and Wales

References

Sources

External links 
 Diocese of Llandaff website
 GigaCatholic – Cardiff Metropolitan Archdiocese
 Bibliography
 Davies, Wendy. (1982). Wales in the Early Middle Ages.
 Doble, G. H. (1971). Lives of the Welsh Saints

Dioceses of the Church in Wales